Espinar Province is one of thirteen provinces in the Cusco Region in the southern highlands of Peru.

Geography 
Some of the highest mountains of the province are listed below:

Political division 
The province is divided into eight districts, each of which is headed by a mayor (alcalde). The districts, with their capitals in parenthesis, are:

 Alto Pichigua (Accocunca)
 Condoroma (Condoroma)
 Coporaque (Coporaque)
 Espinar (Yauri)
 Ocoruro (Ocoruro)
 Pallpata (Hector Tejada)
 Pichigua (Pichigua)
 Suykutambo (Suykutambo)

History 
On 21 May 2012, agricultural leadership in Espinar Province announced a strike against the planned expansion of Tintaya mine, a copper mine owned by the Swiss corporation Xstrata. The leaders' demands included higher environmental standards, more money for area development, and independent oversight of the mine. Strikers occupied the roads to the mine over the following week, blocking all access. In response, President Ollanta Humala declared a state of emergency in the province, suspending constitutional rights, and deployed police commandos against the strikers. Two civilians were killed in the resulting clashes, and seventy police officers were injured. On 30 May, provincial mayor Oscar Mollohuanca was arrested by the national government and accused of inciting protests against an expansion of a copper mine owned by Xstrata. He was conditionally released on 13 July.

Ethnic groups 
The people in the province are mainly indigenous citizens of Quechua descent. Quechua is the language which the majority of the population (68.90%) learnt to speak in childhood, 30.75% of the residents started speaking in Spanish (2007 Peru Census).

See also 
 K'anamarka
 Mawk'allaqta
 Mullu Q'awa
 Qillqa
 Taqrachullu

References 

Provinces of the Cusco Region